Bert F. Crapser (February 11, 1874February 18, 1959) was a Michigan politician.

Early life
Crapser was born on February 11, 1874, in Swartz Creek, Michigan. Crapser was of German parentage.

Career
Crapser was a farmer. On November 5, 1912, was elected to the Michigan House of Representatives where he represented the Genesee County 1st district from January 1, 1913, to January 1, 1915. In this election, he earned 1,513 votes as the Progressive candidate. Republican candidate Ransom L. Ford was in second place, earning 1,451 votes. On November 13, 1914, Ford defeated Crapser, who was vying for re-election. In the 1914 election, Ford earned 1,692 votes compared to Crapser's 353 votes.

Personal life
Crapser was married.

Death
Crapser died on February 18, 1959, in Swartz Creek.

References

1874 births
1959 deaths
American people of German descent
Farmers from Michigan
People from Genesee County, Michigan
Members of the Michigan House of Representatives
Michigan Progressives (1912)
20th-century American politicians